Auldearn  was a railway station located near Nairn, in the Scottish administrative area of Highland. The station was on the line from Aberdeen to Inverness.

History

Opened by the Highland Railway, it became part of the London, Midland and Scottish Railway during the Grouping of 1923. The line then passed on to the Scottish Region of British Railways on nationalisation in 1948. It was then closed by the British Transport Commission.

The site today

Trains still pass the site on the Aberdeen to Inverness Line.

References

 
 
 
 Station on navigable O.S. map

Disused railway stations in Moray
Railway stations in Great Britain opened in 1895
Railway stations in Great Britain closed in 1960
Former Highland Railway stations